The Russian Rhythmic Gymnastics Federation is the governing body of rhythmic gymnastics in Russia.

After the 2022 Russian invasion of Ukraine, the International Gymnastics Federation (FIG) barred Russian athletes and officials, including judges. It also announced that "all FIG World Cup and World Challenge Cup events planned to take place in Russia ... are cancelled, and no other FIG events will be allocated to Russia ... until further notice." FIG also banned the Russian flag and anthem at its events. European Gymnastics announced in March 2022 that no athletes, officials, and judges from the Russian Gymnastics Federation and the Belarus Gymnastics Association can participate in any European Gymnastics events, that no European Gymnastics authorities from Russia and Belarus can pursue their functions, and that European Gymnastics had removed from its calendar all events allocated to Russia and Belarus and would not allocate any future events to Russia or Belarus.

History 
The All-Russian Rhythmic Gymnastics Federation was founded in 1963. It was the central department of the Rhythmic Gymnastics Federation of the Soviet Union. It was responsible for training and preparing athletes for international competition in the Russian SFSR.

The current Russian Rhythmic Gymnastics Federation was founded in 1991. The founding conference was held in Ivanovo on 12 September 1991.

Later, the federation was restructured at a report and election conference in 2001. Sergei Yastrzhembsky, an Adviser to the President of Russia, was elected president of the organization and remained in this position for two consecutive terms. In December 2008, head coach of the national team Irina Viner was elected president, and she now combines the post with that of the head coach.

The Russian Rhythmic Gymnastics Federation is accredited by the Russian Ministry of Sport and has been officially given the status of the country's governing body for the sport of rhythmic gymnastics.

After the 2022 Russian invasion of Ukraine, the International Gymnastics Federation (FIG) barred Russian athletes and officials, including judges. It also announced that "all FIG World Cup and World Challenge Cup events planned to take place in Russia ... are cancelled, and no other FIG events will be allocated to Russia ... until further notice." FIG also banned the Russian flag and anthem at its events.

Events 
The Russian Rhythmic Gymnastics Federation organizes a number of rhythmic gymnastics competitions in Russia. Those include:

Administration 
 Irina Viner — President
 Andrey Guryev — First Vice President
 Mikhail Kusnirovich — Vice President
 Natalia Kuzmina — Vice President
 Irina Tchachina — Vice President
 Evgenia Kanaeva — Vice President
 Tatyana Kolesnikova — Vice President
 Aleksandr Bryksin — Vice President
 Irina Tsaryova — Executive Director
 Tatiana Gorbunova — Executive Secretary

See also 
 Russian Artistic Gymnastics Federation

References 

 

Russia
Gymnastics
Rhythmic gymnastics
Gymnastics organizations
Gymnastics in Russia
Organizations based in Moscow
1991 establishments in Russia
Sports organizations established in 1991